Molson Export beer is a Canadian ale brewed by Molson at a strength of 5% alcohol by volume. It was first brewed in 1903 and is the oldest Molson beer brand still in production.

Label 
In 1955, the traditional anchor and crown logo was replaced by a boat.

Recipe 
Export is made using several varieties of two-row malted barley, an ale yeast strain dating back to the foundation of the Molson Brewery, and Golding and Oregon hops.

Prizes and awards 
 Best beer in its category
Molson Export won the gold medal in the Best North American Style Blonde/Golden Ale category at the 2010 Canadian Brewing Awards. This contest brings together breweries from across Canada and selects the best beers from among them in a blind taste competition. The 2010 edition saw a total of 76 breweries submitting 390 beers across 31 categories. A panel of 20 judges selected the winners based on specific criteria, namely the taste, appearance, aroma, mouth-feel, and overall impression.
Molson Export also took part in the 2011 World Quality Selections, organized by Monde Selection, an Independent International Institute based in Brussels, Belgium. Monde Selection's mission is to test consumer products, rate them for their gustative worth and grant them an award. Molson Export won a Gold Award in 2011 and 2001. The 2011 Monde Selection edition saw a total of 430 beers, coming from 60 countries. However, Monde Selection awards are non-competitive and only products that pay to enter are judged.

Advertising campaigns 

Launched in 1997, the Jeune Depuis 1903 (Young since 1903) campaign in Quebec emphasized the long-standing tradition behind Molson Export. In 2003, as part of this same campaign, Molson Export celebrated its 100th anniversary.

In 2010, Molson Export created a new brand image that again referenced its history and an advertising campaign that focused on John Molson. A TV spot recounting one of his trans-Atlantic voyages went on air while an integrated multimedia campaign focused on him was presented in the Bell Centre and online.

In 2022 Molson Export has teamed up with the NHL and presented the Draft Viewing party. 

For the 2022 Winter Olympics, Molson created a line of maple syrup infused with beer. The Dark Grade syrup was infused with Molson Export.

References

External links 
 Molson Export

Canadian beer brands
Molson Coors brands
1903 establishments in Canada